Dracula – Entre l'amour et la mort ('Dracula: Between Love and Death') is a Québécois musical created by Bruno Pelletier.  Lyrics are written by Roger Tabra; music is by Simon Leclerc; the original concept is credited to Bruno Pelletier and Richard Ouzounian.

The musical ran in Quebec from January 13, 2006, to December 16, 2006.

The album from the musical contains 14 tracks.

Music videos were made for both the track 'Nous sommes ce que nous sommes' and 'Étranges étrangers'.

In January 2008, Draculas cast performed the musical at the Maison de la danse, in Lyon, France with Cassiopée replacing Rita Tabbakh, Julie Dassylva replacing Elyzabeth Diaga, and Matt Laurent replacing Daniel Boucher.

The DVD of the musical was released on March 4, 2008.

Cast 
 Bruno Pelletier Martin Giroux (doublure): Count Dracula
 Sylvain Cossette: Jonathan
 Daniel Boucher, Matt Laurent (2008): Renfield
 Andrée Watters: Mina
 Pierre Flynn: Van Helsing
 Gabrielle Destroismaisons: Lucy
 Rita Tabbakh, Elyzabeth Diaga, Brigitte Marchand, Cassiopée, Julie Dassylva (2008): vampiresses
 Louis Gagné: Grand-Lui
 Claude Pineault, Julie Dassylva, Martin Giroux: singers

External links 
  
  Bruno Pelletier.com
  Cassipée's FanClub
  Cassiopee.ca
  Andrée Watters .com

Plays based on Dracula
Vampires in music
Musicals based on novels
2006 musicals
French-language plays
Quebec plays
Canadian musicals